Paxico is a city in Wabaunsee County, Kansas, United States.  As of the 2020 census, the population of the city was 210.

History

Paxico was originally called Strong Mill, and under this former name was established in 1879 about one mile east of the present town site. A post office was set up and named Paxico, in honor of the Potawatomi medicine man Pashqua. When the railroad was built though the area in 1886, the town moved in order to be alongside it.

In 1887, the Chicago, Kansas and Nebraska Railway built a main line from Topeka through Paxico to Herington.  The Chicago, Kansas and Nebraska Railway was foreclosed in 1891 and taken over by Chicago, Rock Island and Pacific Railway, which shut down in 1980 and reorganized as Oklahoma, Kansas and Texas Railroad, merged in 1988 with Missouri Pacific Railroad, merged in 1997 with Union Pacific Railroad.  Most locals still refer to this railroad as the "Rock Island".

Geography

Demographics

Paxico is part of the Topeka Metropolitan Statistical Area.

2010 census
As of the census of 2010, there were 221 people, 85 households, and 58 families residing in the city. The racial makeup of the city was 91.0% White, 1.8% African American, 0.5% Native American, and 6.8% from two or more races. Hispanic or Latino of any race were 5.4% of the population.

There were 85 households, of which 35.3% had children under the age of 18 living with them, 54.1% were married couples living together, 5.9% had a female householder with no husband present, 8.2% had a male householder with no wife present, and 31.8% were non-families. 24.7% of all households were made up of individuals, and 7.1% had someone living alone who was 65 years of age or older. The average household size was 2.60 and the average family size was 3.00.

The median age in the city was 36.3 years. 28.5% of residents were under the age of 18; 6.3% were between the ages of 18 and 24; 26.3% were from 25 to 44; 25.7% were from 45 to 64; and 13.1% were 65 years of age or older. The gender makeup of the city was 51.1% male and 48.9% female.

2000 census
As of the census of 2000, there were 211 people, 82 households, and 55 families residing in the city. The racial makeup of the city was 94.31% White, 0.95% African American, 0.95% from other races, and 3.79% from two or more races. Hispanic or Latino of any race were 5.21% of the population.

There were 82 households, out of which 31.7% had children under the age of 18 living with them, 53.7% were married couples living together, 9.8% had a female householder with no husband present, and 32.9% were non-families. 29.3% of all households were made up of individuals, and 14.6% had someone living alone who was 65 years of age or older. The average household size was 2.57 and the average family size was 3.22.

In the city, the population was spread out, with 29.4% under the age of 18, 7.6% from 18 to 24, 27.5% from 25 to 44, 22.3% from 45 to 64, and 13.3% who were 65 years of age or older. The median age was 34 years. For every 100 females, there were 102.9 males. For every 100 females age 18 and over, there were 101.4 males.

The median income for a household in the city was $41,250, and the median income for a family was $45,000. Males had a median income of $38,750 versus $26,250 for females. The per capita income for the city was $14,274. About 5.8% of families and 10.3% of the population were below the poverty line, including 9.5% of those under the age of eighteen and 8.7% of those 65 or over.

Education
The community is served by Wabaunsee USD 329 public school district.  USD 329 was formed by school unification that consolidated Alma, Maple Hill, McFarland, and Paxico.  Wabaunsee High School is located in Alma.  The Wabaunsee High School mascot is Wabaunsee Chargers.

Paxico High School was closed through school unification. The Paxico High School mascot was Paxico Pirates.

Area events
 Paxico Meatloaf Festival and Car Show is held on the fourth Saturday in June.
 Paxico Blues Fest is held on the third Saturday in September.

References

Further reading

External links

 Paxico - Directory of Public Officials
 Paxico city map, KDOT

Cities in Wabaunsee County, Kansas
Cities in Kansas
Topeka metropolitan area, Kansas